Ficus montana (common name, oakleaf fig) is a species of subtropical climbing fig plant.  Leaves are 3 to 5 inches long. The leaves are shaped like oak leaves which gives its common name. It is grown as a houseplant, in offices and in shopping malls. It is slow growing.  It is often confused with the tiny F. pumila quercifolia, which is a vining species that creeps on the surface of soil. The Latin specific epithet montana refers to mountains or coming from mountains.

References

External links
 Figs info - Includes info on oakleaf fig Ficus montana

maclellandii
Taxa named by Nicolaas Laurens Burman